Maharaja Agrasen University is a private university located at the HIMUDA Education Hub, near the village Kallujhanda, District Solan, Himachal Pradesh, India. It was founded by Nand Kishore Garg in the town of Barotiwala in 2013.  The university established under Maharaja Agrasen (Establishment and Regulation) Act, 2012 (Act. No. 15 of 2013).

Campus 

The campus spans  and has a hilly environment.

Organisation and administration  

Maharaja Agrasen University has seven schools for undergraduates and postgraduates: 
 Institute of technology of Maharaja Agrasen University University
 School of Architecture & Design
 School of Management
 School of Law
 School of Pharmacy
 School of Humanities, and the 
 School of Applied Science.

Academics

Academic programmes 

Maharaja Agrasen University offers ten arts, commerce, law and sciences programs, four engineering programs, two management programs and one architecture program.

MOUs with other Universities 
A Memoranda of understanding (MoU) has been signed with Ghana Technology University College in Ghana.

Approval
Like all universities in India, Maharaja Agrasen University is recognised by the University Grants Commission (India) (UGC), which has also sent an expert committee and accepted compliance of observations and deficiencies.

Student life

Residential life 
Maharaja Agrasen University requires its students to live on campus for the first four years of undergraduate and two years of postgraduate life. This is part of an administration effort to help students connect more closely with one another and sustain a sense of belonging in the Maharaja Agrasen University community.

Students can choose to reside on either campus or outside campus, although the majority of students choose to live on campus. Campus provides housing for over 450 students in hostel buildings.

Activities 
Maharaja Agrasen University organized a two-day National Seminar on Corporate Social Responsibility for Sustainable and Inclusive Growth in its campus. The Seminar was organised in collaboration with Himachal Pradesh Commerce and Management Association (HPCMA). Prof. A.D.N. Bajpai was the chief guest of the seminar and gave a vivid picture of social activities undertaken by the Himachal University in his tenure.

Notable alumni 
 Angad Singh, Punjab MLA

References

External links 
 

Universities in Himachal Pradesh
Education in Solan district
Memorials to Agrasen
Educational institutions established in 2013
2013 establishments in Himachal Pradesh
Private universities in India